Armenia is a neighborhood located in Quito in the Pichincha Province, Ecuador.

Populated places in Pichincha Province